The Noor Iranian Film Festival is an annual film festival held in Los Angeles, California, founded by cultural producer Siamak Ghahremani and co-founder Anthony Azizi in 2007. The festival's namesake comes from the word Nur, also spelled Noor, meaning to shed light or "noor," on Iranian culture and heritage through Iranian cinema. A non-profit, non-religious, and non-political organization, the Noor Iranian Film Festival (NIFF) was created to shed light, or ‘noor,’ on Persian culture, helping to express the beauty of a culture that is commonly misperceived due to its portrayal in the media. Additional to the main annual festival in Los Angeles, a tour of the program has made several return trips to cities such as Daytona Beach, San Diego, San Francisco, Seattle, and Washington D.C.

The Los Angeles festival has been held at such venues as the James Bridges Theater on the UCLA Campus, Laemmle's Music Hall 3 in Beverly Hills and Magnin Auditorium at the Skirball Cultural Center. It has taken place every year since 2007, with the exception of 2010, where due to Iran's political uprising in 2010, and out of respect for the people in Iran, the festival decided to postpone its 4th festival to 2011. The postponement was also due to a lack of sponsorship and seed money for the festival.

Programming
The program blocks have included feature films, documentaries, short films and animated films, all of which were selected to shed light on Iranian culture and heritage. Their submission guidelines for filmmakers state: "NIFF accepts films from Iranian filmmakers, films made about Iran or Iranians, and/or films that include Iranians as part of the cast or crew."

Judges
1st Annual Noor Film Festival Judges
Natasha Henstridge, Maz Jobrani, Harry Lennix, Shaun Toub, Kyle Secor

2nd Annual Noor Film Festival Judges
Shohreh Aghdashloo, Reza Badiyi, Rainn Wilson, Omid Djalili, Ever Carradine

3rd Annual Noor Film Festival Judges
Brooke Adams, Esai Morales, Habib Zargarpour, Rudi Bakhtiar, Ali Pourtash

4th Annual Noor Film Festival Judges
Corey Feldman, Kami Asgar, Max Martini, Bai Ling, Frances Fisher

5th Annual Noor Film Festival Judges
Navid Negahban, Homa Sarshar, Behrouz Vossoughi, Tony Plana, Kristoff St. John

6th Annual Noor Film Festival Judges
Marshall Manesh, Dennis Haysbert, Faraj Heidari

7th Annual Noor Film Festival Judges
Omid Abtahi, Mahnaz Afshar, Catherine Dent
8th Annual Noor Film Festival judges 

 Reza Sixo Safai, Mozhan Marno, Ayat Najafi

Awards
Additional to judged awards for films screened at the festival, the event selects honorary recipients with a career achievement award. In 2013 the festival announced that the Achievement Award would be renamed the Reza Badiyi Achievement Award, in honor of the director/producer Reza Badiyi, recipient of the festival's first Achievement Award in 2009.

Achievement Awards

Film Awards

2007

2008

2009

2011

2012

2013

2014 

2016

See also
 History of the Iranians in Los Angeles

References

External links
 Noor Iranian Film Festival - Official Website - noorfilmfestival.com
New side - Siamak Qahramani

Cinema of Iran
Iranian-American culture
Iranian-American culture in Los Angeles
Film festivals in Los Angeles
Film festivals established in 2007